Hunter: The Reckoning Survival Guide is a 1999 role-playing game supplement for Hunter: The Reckoning published by White Wolf Publishing.

Contents
Hunter: Survival Guide is a supplement in which the perspective of Hunters on the World of Darkness is explored.

Reception
Hunter: Survival Guide was reviewed in the online second version of Pyramid which said "The Hunter Survival Guide breaks away from the "first sourcebook" jinx, and provides a mostly very good guide to the monsters of the world, and the people who hunt them."

Reviews
Backstab #19
Backstab #35 (Nov 2001) p. 103
Envoyer #55 (May 2001)
Magia i Miecz #2000-01 p. 17-18

References

Role-playing game books
Role-playing game supplements introduced in 1999
World of Darkness